Māris Ārbergs (born 1962) is a Latvian politician. He was a Deputy of the Saeima from 2006 to 2010, as a member of the People's Party.

References

1962 births
Living people
People's Party (Latvia) politicians
Deputies of the 9th Saeima
Date of birth missing (living people)
Place of birth missing (living people)